Josée Helihanta Ramahavalisoa, better known by her stage name Poopy, is a Malagasy pop singer who began singing in 1983. Lonely Planet declared Poopy a "national treasure". She has been active in educating young mothers about breastfeeding their infants as a "nutrition ambassador" for UNICEF.

See also
Music of Madagascar

References

20th-century Malagasy women singers
Year of birth missing (living people)
Place of birth missing (living people)
Living people